Takht-e Narm is a village in Majin Rural District, Majin District, Darreh Shahr County, Ilam Province, Iran. At the 2006 census, its population was 80, in 13 families.

References 

Populated places in Darreh Shahr County